The following is a chronological list of noteworthy anarchist and proto-anarchist periodicals.

Footnotes

Further reading

External links
Cold Off The Presses contains full text copies of anarchist periodicals from the Anarchy Archives.

Lidiap: List of digitized anarchist periodicals A list of freely accessible digitized anarchist journals/newspapers on the internet

Periodicals

Periodicals